The Perfect Husband is a 2014 independent Italian horror film written and directed by Lucas Pavetto. It stars Bret Roberts, Gabriella Wright, Carl Wharton, Tania Bambaci, Philippe Reinhardt, and Daniel Vivian.

Plot 

Viola and Nichola are going through a difficult period. The couple and their relationship was strained by a stillborn birth that has overwhelmed them unexpectedly. To overcome this crisis, the two decide to spend a weekend in an old cottage lost in the woods, but things will take a devilish turn when a crazy suspicion gets into one of their heads. What was supposed to be a quiet weekend will turn suddenly into a deadly nightmare.

Cast 
 Bret Roberts as Nicola
 Gabriella Wright as Viola
 Carl Wharton as Forest Ranger
 Daniel Vivian as Gipsy 
 Tania Bambaci as Doctor 
 Philippe Reinhardt as Hans

Production 

The Perfect Husband is a film from Italy. Filming started in April 2013. Shot and recorded in English, this horror title was set for a release in Italy on December 4, 2014.

Reception 
The film was screened at festivals including Macabre Faire Film Festival, New York City Horror Film Festival, Fantafestival, Fantasporto, and won Best First Work in Fantafestival.

Awards 
Best First Work at the Fantafestival (2014, won)
Best Feature at Week end Of Fear (2015, won)
Best Feature at Miami Independent Film Festival (2015, won)
Best Feature at Vienna Fright Nights (2015, won)
Best Feature at the Open Wound Horror Film Festival (2014, won)
Best Editing Best Sound at the Macabre Faire Film Festival (2015, won)

References

External links 
 
 

Italian horror films
Films shot in Italy
2014 films
2014 horror films
Italian independent films
Italian drama films
2014 directorial debut films
2010s English-language films
2010s Italian films